Donta Hall (born August 7, 1997) is an American professional basketball player who plays for the AS Monaco Basket of the LNB Pro A. He played college basketball for the Alabama Crimson Tide.

Early life and high school career
Hall grew up in Luverne, Alabama and attended Luverne High School, playing on the Tigers' junior varsity team in eighth grade. Hall's father Donald suffered a fatal heart attack at one of his junior varsity games. He was named first team Class 2A All-State after averaging 11.7 points, 10.1 rebounds and 6.7 blocks per game during his junior season as he led Luverne to a 24–2 record and the State final. Hall was rated the 81st best player in his class by ESPN and committed to play college basketball at Alabama at the end of his junior year over offers from UAB, Mississippi State and Troy. As a senior, Hall averaged a triple-double with  22.6 points, 18.1 rebounds and almost 12 blocks per game and was named the Class 2A Player of the Year in addition to being named first team All-State.

College career

As a true freshman, Hall averaged 2.8 points, 4.3 rebounds and 1.7 blocks per game (6th in the Southeastern Conference). He entered the starting lineup for the Crimson Tide in December of his sophomore season, averaging six points, 5.5 rebounds and 1.4 blocks over 34 games (20 starts). As a junior, Hall set an Alabama single-season record, led the SEC, and finished second in the nation with a 72.6 field goal percentage while averaging 10.6 points per game and leading the team with 2.0 blocks (5th in the SEC) and 6.6 rebounds per game and was named to the SEC All-Defensive team. 

Hall led the SEC with 8.8 rebounds per game as a senior while also averaging 10.5 points and 1.6 blocks per game. Hall finished his collegiate career with 1,014 points, 850 rebounds, and 228 blocked shots (seventh-most in Alabama history) in 135 games played with 85 starts.

Professional career

Grand Rapids Drive (2019–2020)
Hall played in the 2019 NBA Summer League as a member of the Detroit Pistons roster and averaged 16.8 minutes, 6.0 points, 5.4 rebounds, 1.6 assists, 1.0 steal and 2.2 blocks per game. Hall signed an Exhibit 10 contract with the Detroit Pistons on July 23, 2019. Hall was waived by the Pistons on October 20, 2019 and subsequently joined the team's NBA G League affiliate, the Grand Rapids Drive, as an affiliate player. On December 31, he missed a game with an undisclosed injury. Hall scored a team-high 24 points and had 12 rebounds, two steals, two blocks and one assist on January 4, 2020 in a 117–113 loss to Raptors 905. Hall was named Midseason All-NBA G League for the Eastern Conference. He averaged 15.4 points and 10.5 rebounds per game, while shooting 66 percent from the field in 36 games with the Drive and was named Second Team All-NBA G League and to the NBA G League All-Defensive Team and the NBA G League All-Rookie Team.

Detroit Pistons (2020)
On February 22, 2020, the Detroit Pistons signed Hall to a 10-day contract. He was promoted after Markieff Morris reached a buyout agreement with the Pistons. Hall made his debut on February 25, recording four points, four rebounds, and an assist against the Denver Nuggets. Hall was signed to a second 10-day contract on March 3, 2020. Hall played in four games with the Pistons and averaged 1.5 points and 3.8 rebounds in 12.0 minutes per game.

Brooklyn Nets (2020)
On July 10, 2020, Hall signed with the Brooklyn Nets as a substitute player for the remainder of the season. Hall averaged 6.6 points, 4.6 rebounds and 1.0 blocks in 17.0 minutes played over five seeding games with the Nets in the 2020 NBA Bubble.

NBA G League Ignite (2021)
On January 14, 2021, the NBA G League Ignite announced that Hall would be added to their roster.

Raptors 905 (2021) 
On February 26, Hall signed a 10-day contract with the Toronto Raptors and was instantly assigned to their affiliate, Raptors 905. On March 3, 2021, Hall was recalled to the Toronto Raptors. By the end of the contract, he had only played for the 905. In 12 games with both Ignite and Raptors 905, he averaged 10.2 points, 8.3 rebounds, 1.5 assists and 2.08 blocks in 24.8 minutes, while shooting .625 (50–80) from the floor.

Orlando Magic (2021)
On April 13, 2021, Hall signed a 10-day contract with the Orlando Magic. On April 23, he signed a second 10-day contract and was waived On May 2. On May 9, he signed for the rest of the season after the Magic was granted the hardship exception. Hall averaged 5.6 points and 4.8 rebounds per game in 13 games for the Magic.

AS Monaco Basket (2021–present)
On August 5, 2021, Hall signed with AS Monaco Basket.

Career statistics

NBA

Regular season

|-
| style="text-align:left;"|
| style="text-align:left;"|Detroit
| 4 || 0 || 12.0 || .250 ||  || .667 || 3.8 || .5 || .3 || .3 || 1.5
|-
| style="text-align:left;"|
| style="text-align:left;"|Brooklyn
| 5 || 0 || 17.0 || .778 ||  || .417 || 4.6 || .4 || .4 || 1.0 || 6.6
|-
| style="text-align:left;"| 
| style="text-align:left;"| Orlando
| 13 || 0 || 13.8 || .714 ||  || .676 || 4.8 || .8 || .4 || .8 || 5.6
|- class="sortbottom"
| style="text-align:center;" colspan="2"|Career
| 22 || 0 || 14.2 || .702 ||  || .615 || 4.5 || .7 || .4 || .7 || 5.1

Playoffs

|-
| style="text-align:left;"|2020
| style="text-align:left;"|Brooklyn
| 3 || 0 || 6.7 || .600 ||  || .250 || 1.7 || .0 || .0 || .7 || 2.3
|-class="sortbottom"
| style="text-align:center;" colspan="2"| Career 
| 3 || 0 || 6.7 || .600 ||  || .250 || 1.7 || .0 || .0 || .7 || 2.3

College

|-
| style="text-align:left;"|2015–16
| style="text-align:left;"|Alabama
| 33 || 0 || 12.8 || .607 ||  || .432 || 4.3 || .2 || .5 || 1.7 || 2.8
|-
| style="text-align:left;"|2016–17
| style="text-align:left;"|Alabama
| 34 || 20 || 19.7 || .658 ||  || .600 || 5.5 || .5 || .5 || 1.4 || 6.0
|-
| style="text-align:left;"|2017–18
| style="text-align:left;"|Alabama
| 34 || 31 || 23.7 || .726 ||  || .556 || 6.6 || .6 || .7 || 2.0 || 10.6
|-
| style="text-align:left;"|2018–19
| style="text-align:left;"|Alabama
| 34 || 34 || 26.8 || .616 || 1.000 || .718 || 8.8 || .5 || .5 || 1.6 || 10.5
|- class="sortbottom"
| style="text-align:center;" colspan="2"|Career
| 135 || 85 || 20.8 || .661 || 1.000 || .607 || 6.3 || .5 || .5 || 1.7 || 7.5

References

External links
NBA G League profile
 Alabama Crimson Tide bio
RealGM profile

1997 births
Living people
Alabama Crimson Tide men's basketball players
American expatriate basketball people in France
American men's basketball players
AS Monaco Basket players
Basketball players from Alabama
Brooklyn Nets players
Centers (basketball)
Detroit Pistons players
Grand Rapids Drive players
NBA G League Ignite players
Orlando Magic players
People from Luverne, Alabama
Raptors 905 players
Undrafted National Basketball Association players